Breivika or Breidvik (Statistics Norway calls it Småland) is a village in the municipality of Inderøy in Trøndelag county, Norway.

References

Villages in Trøndelag
Inderøy